Randi Elisabeth Dyrdal is a Norwegian handball player. She played 35 matches for the Norway women's national handball team between 1974 and 1977.  She participated in the 1975 World Women's Handball Championship.

References

Year of birth missing (living people)
Living people
Norwegian female handball players